Macha Méril (born Princess Maria-Magdalena Vladimirovna Gagarina on 3 September 1940) is a French actress and writer.

Biography
Méril is descended by her father from the Russian princely house Gagarin and by her mother from a Ukrainian noble family. She appeared in 125 films between 1959 and 2012, including films directed by Jean-Luc Godard (A Married Woman / Une femme mariée), Luis Buñuel (Belle de jour), and Rainer Werner Fassbinder (Chinese Roulette). 

She also appeared in the Quebec television series Lance et Compte. She is perhaps best known for her roles as Helga Ulmann in Dario Argento's Deep Red and in Aldo Lado's Night Train Murders (1975).

Theater

Filmography

References

External links
 

1940 births
Living people
20th-century French actresses
21st-century French actresses
French film actresses
French people of Russian descent
French people of Ukrainian descent
French princesses
French television actresses
French women writers
Gagarin family
Chevaliers of the Légion d'honneur
Officers of the Ordre national du Mérite
Writers from Rabat
Ukrainian nobility